Brandenburg is a home rule-class city on the Ohio River in Meade County, Kentucky, in the United States. It is the seat of its county. The population was 2,643 at the 2010 census.

History

Brandenburg was built on a  tract of land called Falling Springs, purchased in 1804 by Solomon Brandenburg. He opened a tavern around which the community grew. In 1825, the community became the seat of Meade County, but it wasn't formally incorporated by the state assembly until March 28, 1872.

During the Civil War, Confederate General John Hunt Morgan crossed at Brandenburg to start his raid into Indiana in July, 1863. During the Battle of Brandenburg Crossing, two men on the Indiana side of the river were killed by cannon fire from Brandenburg. A Union gunship was deployed to block the crossing, but it ran out of ammunition and Morgan and his men were able to pass into Indiana.

Brandenburg was devastated by an F5 tornado during the Super Outbreak of April 3, 1974. The tornado had touched down near Hardinsburg and as it moved to the northeast grew into a half-mile wide wedge tornado, striking Brandenburg head on. The tornado killed 31 people and injured 270, with all but three of the fatalities and most of the injuries occurring at Brandenburg. 128 homes and 30 businesses were also destroyed. There was no early warning from tornado sirens or NOAA Weather Wire Service about the storm. About an hour after the storm, the same supercell spawned an F4 tornado that formed in the southwest part of Louisville in Jefferson County near Kosmosdale. Three people lost their lives in this storm, but it also left two hundred and seven injuries. The Brandenburg tornado remains as the only F5/EF5 tornado in Kentucky state history since official record keeping began in 1950, although later that day another F5 that hit Cincinnati, Ohio crossed the Ohio River from Indiana into Kentucky then into Ohio.

The Confederate Monument in Louisville was relocated to Brandenburg in late 2017 and rededicated in 2018.

Geography
Brandenburg is located at  (37.992664, -86.174657).

Demographics

As of the census of 2000, there were 2,049 people, 844 households, and 535 families residing in the city. The racial makeup of the city was 94.05% White, 3.90% African American, 0.54% Native American, 0.24% from other races, and 1.27% from two or more races. Hispanic or Latino of any race were 0.83% of the population.

There were 844 households, out of which 33.6% had children under the age of 18 living with them, 43.4% were married couples living together, 15.6% had a female householder with no husband present, and 36.5% were non-families. 32.1% of all households were made up of individuals, and 12.9% had someone living alone who was 65 years of age or older. The average household size was 2.32 and the average family size was 2.92.

The age distribution was 26.2% under the age of 18, 9.6% from 18 to 24, 28.6% from 25 to 44, 20.0% from 45 to 64, and 15.6% who were 65 years of age or older. The median age was 36 years. For every 100 females, there were 87.6 males. For every 100 females age 18 and over, there were 82.7 males.

The median income for a household in the city was $36,351, and the median income for a family was $42,950. Males had a median income of $30,565 versus $21,143 for females. The per capita income for the city was $17,863. About 14.4% of families and 15.4% of the population were below the poverty line, including 19.3% of those under age 18 and 19.1% of those age 65 or over.

Education
The Meade County Public Library was founded in 1955 and relocated to a new facility in 2011. The library held the Brandenburg stone from the 1960s until 1996, and has again held the stone since 2012.

Notable people
Chip Jaenichen, former United States Maritime Administrator
Rick Stansbury, college basketball coach

See also
 List of cities and towns along the Ohio River

References

External links

 
 City of Brandenburg

Cities in Kentucky
County seats in Kentucky
Cities in Meade County, Kentucky
Louisville metropolitan area
Populated places established in 1804
Kentucky populated places on the Ohio River